Sorin Lerescu (November 14, 1953) was born in Craiova and is a Romanian composer who studied at the National University of Music in Bucharest.

Lerescu has been active in his profession and is considered by many to be in the forefront of  present-day prospective Romanian music.(Fred Popovici. – In: Sorin Lerescu – L.P. / București: ELECTRECORD ST-ECE 03790, 1991)

He currently teaches counterpoint and composition at the Faculty of Arts of the Spiru Haret University, Bucharest.

He studied composition at the National University of Music in Bucharest with Tiberiu Olah and Anatol Vieru (1975–1979). Postgraduate studies with Ton de Leeuw, Brian Ferneyhough, Morton Feldman (1984). He earned his PhD at the Gheorghe Dima Academy of Music in Cluj-Napoca in 1999 with Ede Terényi.

In 1982 he founded the TRAIECT New Music Group (The Romanian Musical Critics Award in 1983) which introduced to the public, both at home and abroad, a large number of contemporary works, covering a wide range of styles and aesthetic trends characteristic to the new music.

He is the founder and director of the MEETINGS OF NEW MUSIC International Festival in Brăila. President of the Romanian Section of ISCM between 2003 and 2013. Director and co-director of the 14th and 19th INTERNATIONAL WEEK OF NEW MUSIC – SIMN Bucharest. Director of the MERIDIAN, ISCM-Romanian Section International Festival Bucharest (2005–2012).

He has been invited to participate in major festivals and meetings of contemporary music: Trondheim, Darmstadt, Tallinn, Rome, Paris, Warsaw, Timişoara, Chişinău, Belgrade, Cluj-Napoca, Gent, Bucharest, Brăila, Budapest, Odessa, Reggio Emilia, Minsk, Tirana, Plovdiv, Sofia, Curitiba, Minneapolis, ISCM World Music Days: Romania / Republic of Moldova – 1999, Slovenia – 2003, Switzerland – 2004, Croatia – 2005, Germany – 2006, Hong Kong – 2007, Lituania – 2008, Sweden – 2009, Australia – 2010, Croatia – 2011, Belgium 2012.

In 2001 Sorin Lerescu was invited as professor of composition at the Istituto Musicale "Achille Peri" in Reggio Emilia (Italy). In November 2003 he was invited as member of the International Composition Jury of "Valentino Bucchi di Roma Internazionale" (Italy) and as professor of composition (master class). Member of the International Jury of ISCM-CASH Young Composer Award 2006 in Stuttgart (Germany). President of the International Jury of Composition in Plovdiv (Bulgaria) (2008) and member of the International Jury of Composition in Sofia (Bulgaria) (2010 and 2013) and Curitiba (Brazil) (in 2011).

The Prize of the Union of Romanian Composers and Musicologists for chamber music (2003), The Romanian Academy's 2003 "George Enescu" Award for Musical Creation, The Cultural Merit, Bucharest (2004).

His creation includes: works for symphonic orchestra (Modalis I), for string orchestra (Momente), 6 symphonies, 5 concertos, 2 cantatas, instrumental and vocal-instrumental music, electronic music, opera URMUZICA.

His works were performed in concerts and recitals in: France, Belgium, US, Italy, Republic of Moldova, Serbia, Spain, Portugal, The Netherlands, Germany, Belarus, Ukraine, Australia, Slovenia, Switzerland, Austria, Kosovo, Hungary, Albania, Bulgaria, Brazil; recorded or broadcast through the radio and the television by: BBC – Radio 3, Magyar Radio, Polski Radio, Radio Romania Muzical, Radio Romania Cultural, Radio Iaşi, Radio Cluj, TVR, TV SIGMA, Radio 3 Gent, Beogradski Televizja, TVH, SMEI-UCMR, Radio Parana, KFAI Radio, Radio Moldova, TV 7, TV Moldova 1.

Some of his compositions have been recorded on LPs, audio cassettes or CDs: in Romania, by the Romanian Radio Broadcasting Society, ELECTRECORD, INTERCONT MUSIC, Star Media Music, the Union of Romanian Composers and Musicologists (UCMR); in UK by METTIER Sound & Vision Ltd., in Australia by MOVE RECORDS, in France by NOVA MUSICA.

Scores by Sorin Lerescu were published by Editura Muzicală in Bucharest (Romania), CARCIOFOLI Verlagshaus in Zürich (Switzerland) and LUCIAN BADIAN EDITIONS in Ottawa (Canada).

Sorin Lerescu published music analyses and reviews, was an accomplisher or a guest on radio and TV shows, and held conferences about the Romanian contemporary music and his works at home and abroad.

His books Teatrul instrumental (Instrumental theatre), Sinteze de Contrapunct (Synthesis of counterpoint), Contrapunct (Counterpoint) and Contrapunct – în tehnologie IFR (Counterpoint – in part-time learning technology) were published in 2001, 2003, 2011 and 2012 in Bucharest by Editura Fundaţiei România de Mâine (România de Mâine Foundation Publishing House). Another book by Sorin Lerescu, În lumea muzicii contemporane (In the world of contemporary music), was published in 2011 by Editura Muzicală in Bucharest.

External links 
 Biography and the complete list of works
 Composer's website
 Composer's Blog
 sonant100

1953 births
Living people
Romanian composers
People from Craiova
National University of Music Bucharest alumni